Thieves is a 2007 Spanish film directed by Jaime Marques Olarreaga starring Juan José Ballesta and María Valverde.

Plot 
The plot tracks the love story between two pickpockets teaming up together: Álex (raised after age 7 in a foster home) and Sara (a well-off student).

Cast

Production 
The screenplay of Thieves ( directorial feature debut) was penned by Marques Olarreaga alongside Juan Ibáñez, based on an original story by Marques Olarreaga and Enrique López Lavigne. The film was a Estudios Picasso, Pentagrama Films and Maestranza Films production. Shooting locations included Madrid and Bilbao.

Reception 
Reviewing for The Hollywood Reporter, Ray Bennett considered that the film has the "look and feel of a Hollywood vehicle designed to launch its young leads, and that might work, though the film doesn't".

Jonathan Holland of Variety, considered that "though the contrast between gritty theme and dreamy treatment works fine, pic's good looks are sometimes just self-regarding".

Mirito Torreiro of Fotogramas scored the film with 4 out of 5 stars, highlighting the chemistry between Ballesta and Valverde as the best of the film, while citing "some slightly implausible moments" (such as the interrogation) as a negative point.

Release 
The film screened at the Málaga Spanish Film Festival in March 2007 as part of the festival's official selection. Distributed by Warner Bros. Pictures International España, it was theatrically released in Spain on 22 June 2007.

Accolades 

|-
| align = "center" | 2007 || 10th Málaga Spanish Film Festival || colspan = "2" | Silver Biznaga. Jury's Special Award ||  || align = "center" | 
|}

See also 
 List of Spanish films of 2007

References 

2007 films
2000s crime drama films
2007 romantic drama films
Films shot in Madrid
Films shot in Bilbao
2000s Spanish-language films
Telecinco Cinema films
Spanish romantic drama films
Spanish crime drama films
Maestranza Films films
2000s Spanish films